Phyllis Jean Rutledge (March 11, 1932 – May 1, 2015) was an American politician.

A native of Kanawha County, West Virginia, Rutledge served in the West Virginia House of Delegates from 1968 to 1972, and from 1988 to 1994, as a Democrat.

Some of her accomplishments included having introduced a bill requiring a 10% pay cut for all state employees earning more than $50,000. The state Division of Highways once changed its policy on department-funded cell phones because Rutledge said too many calls were being made. She was the Kanawha County coordinator for Hillary Clinton's 2008 presidential campaign.

Death
Rutledge died on May 1, 2015, aged 83, and was survived by two children, six grandchildren and nine great-grandchildren.

Notes

1932 births
2015 deaths
Democratic Party members of the West Virginia House of Delegates
People from Kanawha County, West Virginia
Place of death missing
Women state legislators in West Virginia
21st-century American women